The Nokia X2-02 was a low-cost feature phone that ran on the Nokia S40 mobile operating system and was released under the X-series line. The phone has a stereo FM radio with RDS, internal antennas and an FM transmitter. It is a 2.2" (56mm) TFT display with a 1020 mAh battery.

Additionally, it has music keys, sidebar volume rocker and a hot-swappable micro-SD card slot, as well as a hot-swappable second SIM card slot.

References

External links 
 Official Nokia page

See also
 List of Nokia products

X2-02
Mobile phones introduced in 2011
Mobile phones with user-replaceable battery